Reginald Robinson (11 February 1910 – 17 March 1993) was a professional footballer, born in Sheffield. He played for Scunthorpe United, Huddersfield Town and Exeter City, before finally transferring to Watford in 1936 in exchange for William Brown. He died in Scunthorpe, Lincolnshire, at the age of 83.

References

 

1910 births
1993 deaths
English footballers
Footballers from Sheffield
Association football defenders
English Football League players
Scunthorpe United F.C. players
Huddersfield Town A.F.C. players
Exeter City F.C. players
Watford F.C. players